The Bishop of Lismore was a separate episcopal title which took its name after the town of Lismore in County Waterford, Republic of Ireland.

History
The diocese of Lismore was one of the twenty-four dioceses established by the Synod of Rathbreasail in 1111. The see of Ardmore was incorporated with Lismore in the late 12th century. In 1363, Lismore and Waterford were united by Pope Urban V, and Thomas le Reve became the first bishop of the united see of Waterford and Lismore.

List of bishops of Lismore

See also

 Lismore Cathedral, Ireland

References

Lismore
Religion in County Waterford
Roman Catholic Diocese of Waterford and Lismore
Lismore
Lismore, County Waterford